Ruby Hurley (November 7, 1909 – August 9, 1980) was an American civil rights activist. She was a leader in the Civil Rights Movement and administrator for the NAACP, and was known as the "queen of civil rights".

Early life and education
Ruby Ruffin was born on November 7, 1909, in Washington, D.C., to Alice and Edward R. Ruffin. After she graduated from Dunbar High School in 1926, she attended Miner Teachers College (now known as University of the District of Columbia) and Robert H. Terrell Law School. She worked briefly for the federal government and at the Industrial Bank of Washington. She married William L. Hurley, a lieutenant in the US Army Corps of Engineers in 1942. They ended the marriage in 1952.

In 1939, Hurley was on a committee that was tasked with arranging for a performance from Marian Anderson, an African-American opera singer who had been barred from singing at Constitution Hall by the Daughters of the American Revolution. The committee was able to secure a venue change and Anderson performed at an open-air concert on the steps of the Lincoln Memorial before a crowd of 75,000.

Career with the NAACP
For the next four years, Hurley worked reorganizing the D.C. branch of the National Association for the Advancement of Colored People (NAACP), bolstering their youth council. Walter Francis White, who headed the NAACP, appointed Hurley to the position of national Youth Secretary in 1943. She moved to New York City and stayed in that role until 1950.

In 1951, she moved from New York to Birmingham, Alabama, to set up an NAACP office and oversee membership drives in Tennessee, Mississippi, Alabama, Georgia, and Florida. It was the first permanent NAACP office located in the Deep South. She became Regional Secretary of the NAACP's newly formed Southeast Regional Office the following year. In 1955, Hurley joined with civil rights activists Amzie Moore and Medgar Evers, who was Field Secretary at the NAACP's Mississippi office, in investigating the murders of minister George W. Lee and 14-year-old Emmett Till. In order to interview witnesses for Till's case, Hurley wore cotton picker's clothes. Following the Brown v. Board of Education ruling in 1954, Hurley worked to implement racial integration in the South. While she practiced Christian nonviolence, she appeared on the cover of Jet magazine's October 6, 1955, issue with a caption reading "Most Militant Negro Woman In The South". In 1956, Hurley helped to prepare the case of Autherine Lucy to be allowed to attend the University of Alabama. Hurley's efforts were met with open hostility and she suffered from fatigue and weight loss. Her house was attacked and she received obscene telephone calls. Following a riot at the University of Alabama campus, black taxi drivers offered protection, circling her home.

Hurley was forced to flee Alabama in the night on June 1, 1956, after the state barred the NAACP from operating there. She moved to Atlanta where she opened a regional office four months later. The headquarters became a focal point for civil rights organizers and Hurley worked alongside Vernon Jordan. Jordan and Fredericka Thompson Bradley assisted Charlayne Hunter-Gault and Hamilton E. Holmes in gaining admission to the University of Georgia in 1961. Following the assassination of Medgar Evers in 1963, Hurley convinced his widow Myrlie to have him interred at Arlington National Cemetery.

Death and legacy
Hurley retired on March 31, 1978, and served as president of United Methodist Women. She died on August 9, 1980, in Atlanta. The Chattanooga–Hamilton County NAACP hosts an annual Ruby Hurley Image Awards. In 2009, Hurley was featured alongside Ella Baker on a 42-cent stamp.

References

Further reading

Spring, Kelly. "Ruby Hurley". National Women's History Museum. 2017.

1909 births
1980 deaths
African-American activists
American community activists
NAACP activists
People from Washington, D.C.
Dunbar High School (Washington, D.C.) alumni
20th-century African-American women
Women civil rights activists